Gitanjali Rao (born November 19, 2005) is an American inventor, author, scientist, an engineer, and a science, technology, engineering, and mathematics (STEM) promoter and social activist. She won the Discovery Education 3M Young Scientist Challenge in 2017 and was recognized on Forbes 30 Under 30 for her innovations. Rao was named Time top young innovator of 2020 for her innovations and "innovation workshops" she conducts across the globe and, on December 4, 2020, was featured on the cover of Time and named their first "Kid of the Year".
On November 18, 2021, she was awarded as a Laureate of the Young Activists Summit at UN Geneva.

Early life 
Rao is of Indian descent. She enjoys Indian classical music.
She currently lives in  Lone Tree, Colorado where she attends STEM School Highlands Ranch. Rao has expressed interest in studying genetics and epidemiology.  She is conducting research at the University of Colorado.

Career 
Rao was first influenced by a science kit her uncle gave to her when she was 4 years old. When she was 10, Rao heard about the Flint water crisis while watching the news and became interested in ways to measure the lead content in water.  This led to her using App Inventor to develop a device called Tethys based on carbon nanotubes that could send water quality information via Bluetooth. Rao collaborated with a research scientist at 3M. In 2017, Rao won the Discovery Education 3M Young Scientist Challenge and was awarded $25,000 for her invention, Tethys. Tethys contains a 9-volt battery, a lead sensing unit, a Bluetooth extension and a processor. It uses carbon nanotubes, whose resistance changes in the presence of lead. She learned about the carbon nanotubes while reading the Massachusetts Institute of Technology website. She plans to work with scientists and medical professionals to investigate the potential of Tethys as a viable method. She presented her idea at the 2018 MAKERS conference and raised a further $25,000.  As of January 2019, she was working with the Denver water facility and hopes to have a prototype in the next two years.

She is a three-time TEDx speaker. In September 2018, Rao was awarded the United States Environmental Protection Agency President's Environmental Youth Award.

Rao was also awarded the Top "Health" Pillar Prize for the TCS Ignite Innovation Student Challenge in May 2019 for developing a diagnostic tool called Epione based on advances in genetic engineering for early diagnosis of prescription opioid addiction.

Rao developed an app named "Kindly" that uses artificial intelligence that can detect cyberbullying at an early stage and has partnered with UNICEF to roll-out the service globally.

She is currently a member of Scouts and has enrolled in the Scouting STEM program in the United States. Boys Scout America's own Middle Tennessee Council recognized her as its STEM Scout of the Year in 2017. These honors led to her inclusion in the delegation for the 2017 BSA Report to the Nation.  She is also working on getting her pilot's license.

In 2020, Rao became the first person to receive Time magazine's Kid of the Year designation. Rao is also the author of the book," Young Inventor's Guide to STEM", which elaborates on her 5 Steps To Problem-Solving For Students, Educators, and Parents. Rao conducts innovation workshops for students throughout the globe in partnership with after school clubs, schools, science museums, STEM organizations and other educational organizations to promote a problem-solving curriculum for K-12 students.

In 2022, Rao got an internship opportunity to be at the Koch Institute. MIT and Broad Institute at Cambridge, MA.

References 

2005 births
21st-century American inventors
American children
People from Douglas County, Colorado
Scientists from Colorado
Time (magazine) people
Women inventors
American academics of Indian descent
21st-century American women scientists
Living people
Inventors from Colorado
Time Kid of the Year